That's All is a 1965 studio album by Mel Tormé, arranged by Robert Mersey.

In 1997 it was reissued with 12 bonus tracks.

Track listing
"I've Got You Under My Skin" (Cole Porter) – 2:52
"That's All" (Alan Brandt, Bob Haymes) – 3:50
"What Is There to Say?" (Vernon Duke, Yip Harburg) – 3:11
"Do I Love You Because You're Beautiful?" (Oscar Hammerstein II, Richard Rodgers) – 2:50
"The Folks Who Live On the Hill" (Hammerstein, Jerome Kern) – 3:35
"Isn't It a Pity?" (George Gershwin, Ira Gershwin) – 3:08
"Hô-Bá-Lá-Lá" (João Gilberto, Norman Gimbel) – 2:54
"P.S. I Love You" (Gordon Jenkins, Johnny Mercer) – 2:47
"The Nearness of You" (Hoagy Carmichael, Ned Washington) – 2:51
"My Romance" (Lorenz Hart, Rodgers) – 2:46
"The Second Time Around" (Sammy Cahn, Jimmy Van Heusen) – 2:51
"Haven't We Met?" (Ruth Bachelor, Kenny Rankin) – 2:23
 Bonus tracks included on the 1997 CD release:
"I Know Your Heart" (Timothy Gray, Ted Gray, Hugh Martin) – 2:35
"You'd Better Love Me" (Timothy Gray, Martin) – 2:23
"I See It Now" (William Engvick, Alec Wilder) – 2:58
"Once in a Lifetime" (Leslie Bricusse, Anthony Newley) – 2:23
"Hang on to Me" (George Gershwin, Ira Gershwin, Peter Matz, Robyn Supraner) – 2:56
"Seventeen" (Harry Chapin) – 2:51
"I Remember Suzanne" (Stewart, Wolfe) – 2:52
"Only the Very Young" (Mel Tormé) – 2:30
"Paris Smiles" (Evans, Jarre, Livingston) – 2:53
"Ev'ry Day's a Holiday" (Mort Garson, Bob Hilliard) – 2:44
"One Little Snowflake" (Tormé) – 2:37
"The Christmas Song" (Tormé, Robert Wells) – 3:10

Personnel 
Mel Tormé - vocals
Robert Mersey - arranger

References

1965 albums
Mel Tormé albums
Columbia Records albums